Arthur Henry Howe Jr. (born December 15, 1946) is an American former professional baseball infielder, coach, scout, and manager, who appeared as a player in Major League Baseball (MLB) for the Pittsburgh Pirates (–), Houston Astros (–), and St. Louis Cardinals (–). Howe managed the Astros (–), Oakland Athletics (–), and New York Mets (–), compiling a career managerial record of 1,129 wins and 1,137 losses.

Playing career
Howe was born in Pittsburgh, Pennsylvania and attended Shaler Area High School. After graduating he attended the University of Wyoming on a college football scholarship, but played baseball after injuries ended his football career. and signed his first playing contract at age 24, with the Pittsburgh Pirates in 1971. He came to the major leagues as a part-time player with Pittsburgh in 1974–75, before a trade to the Astros for infielder Tommy Helms on January 6, 1976. He played all four infield positions, mostly as a third baseman and second baseman, for Houston from 1976 to 1982. While playing in only 125 games in 1977, and alternating among 2B, SS and 3B, Howe committed just 8 errors. On May 7, 1980, he suffered a fractured jaw when hit by a pitch from Expos pitcher Scott Sanderson.

In May 1981 he won the Player of the Month Award, the only Astros third baseman to win it until it was also won by Alex Bregman in June 2018. After missing the entire 1983 season with an injury, he finished his playing career with the St. Louis Cardinals (1984–85). The right-handed hitter appeared in 891 games over all or parts of 11 seasons, compiling a lifetime batting average of .260 with 43 home runs.

As a coach and manager

In 1986, Howe began his coaching career as an aide to Bobby Valentine with the Texas Rangers. After three seasons, he was hired by his old team, the Astros, as manager for 1989, succeeding Hal Lanier. Howe enjoyed a successful first season in Houston, but the team was rebuilding with young players such as Jeff Bagwell and Craig Biggio, and suffered losing years in 1990–91. In 1992 and 1993 the Astros improved to .500 and then a winning record, but Howe was fired in favor of Terry Collins at the close of the '93 campaign. During the 1994–95 Dominican Winter League season, Howe led the Azucareros del Este to their first championship.

After a year as a Major League scout for the Los Angeles Dodgers, and spending 1995 as bench coach for the Colorado Rockies, Howe was selected to replace the high-profile Tony La Russa as manager of the Athletics for 1996. The A's suffered through three losing seasons under Howe before, in 1999, they returned to contention. In 2000, 2001 and 2002, the A's won 91, 102 and 103 games respectively and made the American League playoffs in each season.  But they did not win a playoff series, losing each time in the Division Series in five games. This included losing Game 5 at home in 2000 and 2002 and blowing a 2–0 lead in the 2001 series. Gradually, Howe and general manager Billy Beane grew estranged. At the end of 2002, despite a seven-year mark of 600–533 (.530), Howe was released from his Oakland contract to become the manager of the New York Mets.

Oscar-winning actor Philip Seymour Hoffman portrayed Howe in the film Moneyball, which dramatized Billy Beane's tactics of using sabermetrics to select players. Howe stated that he was unhappy with his portrayal in both the film and the Michael Lewis book it was based on, in which Howe was portrayed as a stubborn traditionalist who refused to follow Beane's plans and a figurehead who submitted while Beane ran the A's from the clubhouse, which differed from the real tanglements of Howe and Beane being more about the former being a team player in utilizing the methods of the latter despite his lingering doubts, with Howe being described in the press as a "good company man". Howe said it was unfortunate that Beane's lack of regard for him was that obvious.

Howe's two years in New York proved highly unsuccessful. The Mets won only 42 percent of their games, the front office went through three general managers, and attendance at Shea Stadium fell. Likely the only bright spot was Howe winning his 1000th game as manager on April 20, 2003, winning 7–4 against the Florida Marlins. In September 2004, word of Howe's impending firing was leaked to the media two weeks before the season ended, but he was allowed to finish the year. Ultimately, the general manager of the club, Omar Minaya, replaced Howe with Willie Randolph, bench coach for the New York Yankees.

On October 16, 2006, Howe was hired as the third base coach and an infield instructor by the Philadelphia Phillies.  After the Texas Rangers hired Ron Washington – a former coach under Howe in Oakland – as their manager, the Phillies gave Howe permission to speak with the Rangers about any openings in the organization.  On November 7, 2006, Howe was hired by the Rangers as Washington's bench coach. He served two years in that role (2007–08) but his contract was not renewed at the end of the Rangers' disappointing 2008 season.

Managerial record

Personal life
Howe is married to his high school sweetheart, Betty. They have three children and six grandchildren. On May 14, 2020, Howe confirmed that he was in an ICU suffering from Covid-19. On May 17, 2020, he was released from the hospital, and sent home, reportedly "weak, but on the mend".

See also

 Houston Astros award winners and league leaders
 List of Major League Baseball managers by wins

References

External links

Art Howe at Astros Daily
Art Howe at Ultimate Mets Database

1946 births
Living people
Major League Baseball third basemen
Major League Baseball second basemen
Pittsburgh Pirates players
Houston Astros players
St. Louis Cardinals players
Houston Astros managers
Oakland Athletics managers
New York Mets managers
Caribbean Series managers
Major League Baseball bench coaches
Major League Baseball hitting coaches
Baseball players from Pittsburgh
Charleston Charlies players
Texas Rangers coaches
Colorado Rockies (baseball) coaches
Los Angeles Dodgers scouts
Wyoming Cowboys baseball players
Sportspeople from Pittsburgh
American expatriate baseball people in the Dominican Republic